Dasht-e Azadegan may refer to:
Dasht-e Azadegan, Fars
Dasht-e Azadegan, Isfahan
Dasht-e Azadegan County, an administrative subdivision of Khuzestan Province, Iran
Susangerd, capital of the previous

See also
Azadegan (disambiguation)
Azadegan, Iran (disambiguation)